Drycothaea truncatipennis is a species of beetle in the family Cerambycidae. It was described by Tavakilian in 1997. It is known from Brazil.

References

Calliini
Beetles described in 1997